Ale the Strong (Heimskringla) or Ole (English: Ola), in Scandinavian legend, belonged to the House of Skjöldung (Scylding), and he was the son of king Fridleif of Denmark and a cousin of Helgi's (and consequently of the Hrothgar of Beowulf). He fought several battles against king Aun of Uppsala, and he ruled in Uppsala for 25 years until he was killed by Starkad the old.

According to Starbäck and Bäckström, Saxo Grammaticus tells a related story in Gesta Danorum.

Starkad was accepted with honour in the warband of the Norwegian hero Ole (Olo). However, when Ole had succeeded in conquering Zealand, Starkad was convinced to join Lennius/Lenus/Lennus scheme to attack and kill Ole. However, Ole was hard to kill as his gaze scared everyone. It was not until Starkad managed to cover Ole's face that he could kill him. Starkad was rewarded with 120 pounds in gold, but regretted his crime, and avenged Ole's death by killing Lennius.

Mythological kings of Sweden